Oliver Trinder (3 October 1907 – 12 February 1981) was a British fencer. He competed in the individual and team sabre events at the 1936 Summer Olympics, reaching the semi-finals.

References

1907 births
1981 deaths
British male fencers
Olympic fencers of Great Britain
Fencers at the 1936 Summer Olympics
Sportspeople from Dartford